Sohagpur Assembly constituency is one of the 230 Vidhan Sabha (Legislative Assembly) constituencies of Madhya Pradesh state in central India.

It is part of Narmadapuram District.

See also
 Sohagpur

References

Assembly constituencies of Madhya Pradesh